Archibald Allan Scott, AO (1923–28 October 2008) was a South Australian businessman, most well known for his Mount Gambier-based transport, property and media interests.

Career
Scott was best known for founding the truck organisation Scott's Transport in Mount Gambier, South Australia, which has since grown to be one of the biggest freight companies in Australia, rivalling Linfox. In 1988 Scott purchased local rival transport company K&S Freighters and then listed it on the Australian Securities Exchange. Alongside trucking, he had many business interests in Mount Gambier, including the town's newspaper, The Border Watch and television station SES8. He also owned two regional radio stations, Adelaide radio station 5DN, hotels, shopping centres and cattle properties in Queensland and Victoria.

Scott was awarded a medal of Order of Australia (OAM) in June 1986 and made an Officer of the Order of Australia (AO) in June 2006 for "service to the development of the transport industry, focusing on heavy vehicle driver safety training and through lobbying for improved infrastructure and development of an integrated freight network, and to the community through a broad range of sporting, medical research and aged care organisations".

In 1997, Scott's became a major sponsor of Port Adelaide Football Club upon their entry into the Australian Football League. In early 2004, Scott criticised Port Adelaide coach Mark Williams, stating that Williams would never coach Port to an AFL premiership. Following Port Adelaide's victory in the 2004 AFL Grand Final, Williams made the famous speech "Allan Scott — You were wrong!".

Personal life 
After a 55-year career, Scott died of heart failure on 28 October 2008 in hospital in Mount Gambier aged 85. He was survived by his wife Grace, children, and 14 grandchildren. His death as one of Australia's richest people led to a highly publicised legal battle over his $600 million fortune among his family.

References

1923 births
2008 deaths
People from Mount Gambier, South Australia
Officers of the Order of Australia
Recipients of the Medal of the Order of Australia
20th-century Australian businesspeople